Robert Wylie or Robert Wyllie may refer to:

 Robert Wylie (artist), American artist
 Robert Wylie (cricketer), New Zealand cricketer
 Robert Crichton Wyllie, Scottish physician and politician in the Hawaiian Kingdom